The Roman Catholic Diocese of Rochester is a diocese of the Catholic Church in the Upstate region of New York State in the United States. The diocese extends from Lake Ontario through Rochester, New York and the Finger Lakes region to part of the Southern Tier region near the New York-Pennsylvania border.

The Diocese of Rochester comprises 12 counties with approximately 350,000 Catholics and over 125 faith communities (parishes and chapels), 22 diocesan elementary schools and seven independent parochial high schools. The bishop of the diocese is currently Salvatore Matano. The metropolitan for the diocese is the archbishop of the Archdiocese of New York, currently Cardinal Timothy Dolan. The cathedral parish for the diocese is Sacred Heart Cathedral in Rochester.

History

Founding 

The Diocese of Rochester was erected on March 3, 1868, by Pope Pius IX. He transferred eight counties (Monroe, Livingston, Wayne, Ontario, Seneca, Cayuga, Yates, and Tompkins) from the Diocese of Buffalo to the new Diocese of Rochester.  The pope appointed Monsignor Bernard J. McQuaid, from what was then the Diocese of New York, as the first bishop of Rochester. The new diocese included approximately 54,500 Catholics in 35 parish churches and 29 mission churches.

In 1896, Pope Leo XIII transferred four more southern counties (Schuyler, Tioga, Chemung, and Steuben) from the Diocese of Buffalo to the Diocese of Rochester, forming its current boundaries.

Population growth 
The Diocese of Rochester grew as more Catholic immigrants moved to Rochester,  peaking in the 1960s. Since then, the Catholic population has stabilized while the numbers of ordained presbyters (priests) and religious sisters has fallen.
In 1909, there were 121,000 Catholics in 93 parishes, 36 missions and 53 parish schools with 18,000 pupils. There were 164 priests and more than 500 sisters.
In 1938, there were 223,657 Catholics in 129 parishes, 36 missions and 72 parish schools serving 23,796 pupils. There were 289 active diocesan priests.
In 1966, there were 361,790 Catholics in 155 parishes, 36 mission churches and 99 elementary parish schools serving 45,540 pupils. There were 371 active diocesan priests and 1,549 sisters.
In 1978, there were 358,850 Catholics in 161 parishes, 29 mission churches and 75 schools serving 19,526 pupils. There were 311 active diocesan priests and 1,095 sisters.
In 1992, there were 361,384 Catholics in 162 parishes and 58 elementary schools serving 11,992 pupils. There were 208 active diocesan priests and 842 sisters.

On September 22, 2017, the Diocese of Rochester inaugurated its sesquicentennial anniversary marked by a solemn mass at Sacred Heart Cathedral. This event marks a year long celebration of the 150 year anniversary and the year of the Eucharist which was proclaimed by Bishop Matano on the Feast of Corpus Christi.

Sex abuse allegations
in May 2002, two men sued the Diocese of Rochester, alleging that they had been sexually abused by Robert O'Neil, pastor of St. Christopher Parish in Chili, New York.  The plaintiffs said that O'Neil took them in the 1970's to his cottage in Chaumont, New York, where he would ply them with alcohol and abuse them.  Two parishioners complained about O'Neil during that time to Auxiliary Bishop Dennis Hickey.  O'Neil was sent away for treatment at some point, then returned to pastoral work.  A week before the lawsuit, the diocese stripped O'Neil of his ministerial duties and banned him from diocesan housing.

The Diocese of Rochester revealed in June 2018 that it had paid $1.6 million  in compensation since 1950 to 20 individuals who had been sexually abused by diocesan clergy. Most of the payments occurred after 2002, although some were decades old. On June 10, 2019, a Rochester man sued the diocese alleging sexual abuse by Francis Vogt.  between 1969 and 1971.  The plaintiff said that Vogt started abusing him when he was five years old and that the diocese shielded Vogt from potential prosecution.

On September 12, 2019, the Diocese of Rochester filed for Chapter 11 bankruptcy in the wake of lawsuits against clergy who served in the diocese. It was the first diocese in New York State to file for bankruptcy and the 20th diocese in the United States.

By August 3, 2020, 70 people had filed lawsuits against the diocese, claiming sexual abuse by priests, nuns and lay people.  The new wave of lawsuits 21 clergy who had not been identified before by the diocese. By August 19, 2020, 503 people had filed sex abuse lawsuits against the diocese under the 2019 New York Child Victims Act. The diocese announced on April 6, 2021 that 300 more sex abuse lawsuits were filed against the diocese between August 14, 2019, and December 31, 2020 under the 2019 New York Child Victims Act.

Bishops
The following are lists of bishops and their years of service:

Bishops of Rochester
 Bernard J. McQuaid (1868–1909)
 Thomas F. Hickey (1909–1928; coadjutor bishop 1905-1909), appointed archbishop ad personam upon retirement
 John Francis O'Hern (1929–1933)
 Edward A. Mooney (1933–1937), archbishop (ad personam), appointed Archbishop of Detroit (Cardinal in 1946)
 James E. Kearney (1937–1966)
 Fulton J. Sheen (1966-–1969), appointed archbishop ad personam upon retirement
 Joseph Lloyd Hogan (1969–1978)
 Matthew H. Clark (1979–2012)
 Salvatore Ronald Matano (2013–present)

Former auxiliary bishops
 Lawrence B. Casey (1953–1966), appointed bishop of Paterson
 John Edgar McCafferty (1968–1980)
 Dennis Walter Hickey (1968–1990)

Other diocesan priests who became bishops
Edward Joseph Hanna, appointed auxiliary bishop of San Francisco in 1912 and later archbishop of San Francisco
Walter Andrew Foery, appointed bishop of Syracuse in 1937
James Michael Moynihan, appointed bishop of Syracuse in 1995

Schools

Primary schools

Former primary schools
Over the years, as Catholic populations moved to the suburbs, the Diocese of Rochester has closed parishes and their schools.  These include the former Holy Apostles, Holy Redeemer, Holy Rosary, Immaculate Conception, Our Lady of Mt. Carmel, Our Lady of Perpetual Help, Our Lady of Victory, Sacred Heart, St. Anthony of Padua, St. Augustine, St. Casimir, St. Francis Xavier, St. Helen, St. John the Evangelist, St. Joseph, St. Lucy, St. Mary, St. Michael, St. Patrick, Ss. Peter and Paul, St. Stanislaus, and St. Theresa.

In 2008, facing growing deficits and declining enrollments, the diocese closed the following schools:
Holy Family School, Dansville
All Saints Catholic Academy, Gates
Catherine McAuley, Greece
St. Margaret Mary, Irondequoit
Holy Trinity, Webster
St. John of Rochester, Fairport
St. John the Evangelist, Spencerport
Good Shepherd, Henrietta
Holy Cross, Rochester (reopened in 2011)
Holy Family, Rochester
Corpus Christi, Rochester
St. Andrews, Rochester
St. Boniface, Rochester
St. Monica, Rochester

In May 2020, the diocese announced that Siena Catholic Academy would close at the end of the 2019-2020 school year.

High schools
The diocese has five traditionally Catholic high schools (or combined junior/senior high schools).  These schools were founded by various religious orders and operate independently of the diocese itself.

Former high schools
Academy of the Sacred Heart, Rochester,  1855–1969
Cardinal Mooney High School, Greece, 1962–1989
DeSales High School, Geneva, 1912–2012
Nazareth Academy, Rochester, 1871–2010
St. Agnes High School, Rochester, 1954–1982
King's Preparatory, Rochester, 1967–1970
St. Anthony of Padua College Prep School, Watkins Glen, 1949–1970
Holy Family High School, Auburn, 1904–1957
Mt. Carmel High School, Auburn, 1957–1970

Former seminaries
St. Andrew's Preparatory Seminary, 1870–1967
Saint Bernard's Seminary, 1893–1981

Former liberal arts colleges
Nazareth College, became independent in the 1970s
St. John Fisher College, became independent in 1968

Former charitable institutions
St. Ann's Home (now St. Ann's Community)
St. Joseph's Orphan Asylum (later St. Joseph's Villa, now Villa of Hope)
St. Mary's Boys' Home
St. Mary's Hospital, Rochester, Monroe County
St. Patrick's Girls' Home

Counties
This is a list of the counties in New York State that fall into the Diocese of Rochester:
 Monroe
 Livingston
 Wayne
 Ontario
 Seneca
 Cayuga
 Yates
 Tompkins
 Schuyler (added in 1896)
 Tioga (added in 1896)
 Chemung (added in 1896)
 Steuben (added in 1896)

Publishing 
The Rochester Catholic Press Association, Inc. (RCPA) is a New York 501(c)3 organization that serves as the publishing arm of the Diocese of Rochester. The RCPA publishes the monthly Catholic Courier newspaper, the Spanish-language El Mensajero Católico, the Official Directory of the Diocese of Rochester and related digital media.

The Courier was founded in 1889 as The Catholic Journal. The paper became the Catholic Courier in 1989, its 100th anniversary. The Rochester Diocese took ownership of the newspaper during the Great Depression. The Courier has won state and national awards for journalistic excellence.

Arms

References

External links
Roman Catholic Diocese of Rochester Official Site
Catholic Courier Official Site

 
Religious organizations established in 1868
Roman Catholic dioceses and prelatures established in the 19th century
1868 establishments in New York (state)
Companies that filed for Chapter 11 bankruptcy in 2019
Rochester